The following is a list of deputies who stood down at the 2022 French legislative election.

List

See also 
 Election results of Cabinet Ministers during the 2022 French legislative election
 List of MPs who lost their seat in the 2022 French legislative election
 Results of the 2022 French legislative election by constituency

Notes

References

See also 

2022 French legislative election
Lists of French politicians
French political candidates